Semen Osynovskyi (25 September 1960) is a former professional Soviet football midfielder and coach.

References

External links
 
 
 As a coach. Luhansk Nash Futbol.
 Valerko, A. Serhiy Shevchenko. SC Tavriya Simferopol (from Football.ua).

1960 births
Living people
People from Kara-Balta
Soviet footballers
Kyrgyzstani footballers
FC Alga Bishkek players
JK Dünamo Tallinn players
SC Tavriya Simferopol players
FC APK Morozovsk players
FC Dnipro Cherkasy players
FC Orto-Nur Sokuluk players
Ukrainian football managers
FC Dnipro Cherkasy managers
FC Krystal Chortkiv managers
Ukrainian expatriate football managers
Ukrainian expatriate sportspeople in Libya
Expatriate football managers in Libya
Al-Ittihad Tripoli managers
FC Kremin Kremenchuk managers
FC Vorskla-2 Poltava managers
FC Polissya Zhytomyr managers
Association football midfielders